Adalberto Román Benítez (born 11 April 1987), is a Paraguayan footballer who most recently played for Club Sportivo San Lorenzo.

Club career
Román started his carry in 2006 with Libertad on a 5–1 victory over 12 de Octubre, scoring his first professional goal on that same game.

In 2010, the Paraguayan defender was bought by Argentine side River Plate.

Román made his debut in the fourth round of the 2010 Apertura against Argentinos Juniors, a match that ended in a scoreless draw. After that match, the fans started calling him the Paraguayan Maldini, despite playing out of position mostly filling as right-back. He scored his first goal for River in the ninth round of the Apertura in the 86th minute to earn a 2–2 draw for his club, a header to draw with Banfield. He scored his second goal for the club in 1–0 win over Olimpo in round 16, another header. He scored his third goal in the final round of the Apertura in 4–1 victory over Lanús. During the Clausura he was often criticized for its poor performances and poor form, during the promotion against Belgrano he created a penalty which would later be influential in River Plate relegation to Nacional B. 
Despite criticism of River Plate fans, Román was still included in the Nacional B squad but manager Matías Almeyda only used him during a 2–0 defeat against Atlético Tucumán in November 13.

In 2012, Román went to Palmeiras on loan for a year.

In 2013, Roman returned to River Plate.

Honours

Palmeiras
Copa do Brasil: 2012

References

External links

Living people
1987 births
Paraguayan footballers
Paraguay international footballers
Paraguayan expatriate footballers
Club Libertad footballers
Paraguayan Primera División players
Campeonato Brasileiro Série A players
Argentine Primera División players
Club Atlético River Plate footballers
Expatriate footballers in Argentina
Sociedade Esportiva Palmeiras players
Expatriate footballers in Brazil
Association football defenders